John Butman (1951 – March 23, 2020) is an American writer. He has written several books under his own name and collaborated on more than thirty other titles, including New York Times and Boston Globe bestsellers and Economist award winners.

Background

Butman graduated with a degree in film direction from New York University's Tisch School of the Arts in 1972. He founded the content development firm Idea Platforms, Inc. in 1989, which advises and collaborates with leading thinkers, strategists, and content experts in the development of ideas, creation of books, and building of idea platforms. He is an affiliated literary agent with the Boston-based firm Kneerim & Williams. He lives in Portland, ME.

Bibliography

 New World, Inc: The Making of America by England's Merchant Adventurers (Little, Brown, 2018) 
 Breaking Out: How To Build Influence in a World of Competing Ideas (Harvard Business Review Press, 2013) 
 Townie (Permanent Press, 2002) 
 Juran: A Lifetime of Influence (John Wiley & Sons, 1997) 
 The Book That's Sweeping America! Or, Why I Love Business! (John Wiley & Sons, Inc., 1997)

References 

American male writers
Living people
Tisch School of the Arts alumni
1951 births